Kabash is a town in the Vitina Municipality of southeast Kosovo.

History 
The ancestors of the inhabitants of the village belong to the Kabashi tribe.

The Austro-Hungarian consulate in Belgrade reported that during February 1913, Serbian military forces executed all Albanian inhabitants of the villages of Kabash, Tërpezë, Lubisht and Gjylekar.

Geography 
The village is located in the Anamorava valley and is stiuated on the foot of the Karadak mountains.

Notes and references
Notes:

References:

Villages in Viti, Kosovo